The Ark Of Gemini is the second album by Indian heavy metal band Kryptos. The album was released worldwide on June 13, 2008 through Old School Metal Records. This album sees the founding member and the guitarist of the band, Nolan Lewis take over the vocal duties after the departure of original vocalist Ganesh K. All the lyrics of this album have been written by Nolan Lewis, except the track Trident  which was written both by Nolan Lewis and bassist, Jayawant Tewari.

The artwork and inner sleeves were designed by Prasad Bhat and Diwakar Das.

Track listing
 "Sphere VII" – 5:19
 "Order of the D.N.A" – 2:45
 "Heretic Supreme" – 4:49
 "Tower of Illusions" – 6:18
 "The Revenant" – 4:55
 "Vulcan" – 6:23
 "Trident" – 4:55
 "Liquid Grave" – 4:19
 "In The Presence of Eternity" – 2:52

Line up
 Nolan Lewis – Guitar, vocals
 Rohit Chaturvedi – Guitar
 Jayawant Tewari – Bass
 Ryan Colaco – Drums

2008 albums
Kryptos (band) albums